The Army Deployment Force (ADF) is a rapid deployment unit of the Singapore Army responsible for conducting counter-terrorism and expeditionary operations. It consists of only regular servicemen, primarily from the Guards formation. The ADF was established in 2016, in response to modernised terrorist attacks such as the November 2015 Paris attacks.

History
The Army Deployment Force was officially inaugurated on 12 July 2016 in Nee Soon Camp, with roughly 600 regular servicemen at the time of inception. This discrete rapid deployment battalion is operationally-ready to a high readiness state, ready to respond to any civil emergencies and actively able to respond "at the push of the button". The motto "Always Ready" stands for always ready for any national exigency.

Its first operational mission began in August 2016, when ADF servicemen were rotationally deployed to Iraq as cover safety and protection for the medical teams by Singapore to assist the international coalition forces that are in combat with the Islamic State of Iraq and the Levant (ISIS).

The unit received their regimental colours from President Halimah Yacob on 1 July 2021, as part of the SAF Day Parade.

Role

The ADF's primary role is to provide rapid response to terror threats or national exigencies in both urban and non-urban settings, and supporting the Special Operations Task Force (SOTF), Island Defence Task Force (IDTF), as well as the various Home Team agencies.

Secondarily, it can respond to civil emergencies or Peace Time Contingency Operations (PTCO). Additionally, it is also capable of being deployed for both Peace Support Operations (PSO) and Humanitarian Assistance and Disaster Relief operations (HADR) both within and around Singapore.

Training
ADF troopers are trained to provide the army with niche capabilities, with much of the training for the Singapore Guards coming into play as troopers develop their roles in the unit. ADF training is primarily conducted in Nee Soon Camp.

Combat Qualification Course

In order to be inducted into the Army Deployment Force, aspiring soldiers are required to complete the grueling 21-week long Combat Qualification Course (CQC). The course trains and equips ADF troopers with key capabilities enabling them to respond to any threat or peacetime contingency quickly and effectively, it also serves to test the physical and mental readiness of trainees before they are posted to the ADF's operational companies. The course covers a range of skillsets such as weapon proficiency, unarmed combat, conventional warfare, urban operations, fast-roping and rappelling, Peacetime Contingency Operations (PTCO), as well as Peace Support and Humanitarian Aid and Disaster Response (HADR) operations.

As part of their graduation criteria, trainees are required to complete a 10km march in 90 minutes, a warrior competition that tests their combat fitness and weapon competency, and an 18-hour finale exercise.

Equipment

Some of the equipments of the ADF include:

 Milkor MGL
 Peacekeeper Protected Response Vehicle (PRV)
 SAR 21 Variants
 Sig Sauer P226
 Heckler & Koch P30LS
 Remington 870 MCS
 Taser

Other than weapons, ADF also uses the Water Purification Units (WPU) trucks and Protected Light Utility Vehicles (PLUVs). ADF's equipment varies depending on their tasks and mission.

See also
 Guards

References 

2016 establishments in Singapore
Counterterrorism in Singapore
Military units and formations of Singapore
Military units and formations established in 2016